Yuliya Sergeeva Biryukova (born 17 March 1985) is a Russian foil fencer.

Biography
Biryukova took up fencing at the age of six in her native Kurchatov. She won a team silver medal at the 2003 Junior World Championships in Trapani, then a team gold medal and an individual bronze medal a year later in Plovdiv. She won the gold medal at the 2007 Summer Universiade in Bangkok.

In the senior category, she climbed her first World Cup podium in the 2008–09 season with a silver medal in Gdańsk, followed by a bronze medal in Havana. She won a team silver medal at the European Championships in Plovdiv. At the World Championships in Antalya she was defeated in the quarter-finals by team-mate Aida Shanayeva, who eventually won the gold medal. In the team event Russia stumbled against Italy in the final and came away with another silver medal. Biryukova finished the season world No.8, a career best as of 2014.

Biryukova took an individual bronze medal and a team silver medal in the 2011 Summer Universiade, and another team silver in the 2013 edition. The same year, she won a team bronze medal at the World Championships in Budapest. In the 2013–14 season she won her first major individual title with a bronze medal at the European Championships in Strasbourg. She went on to win a second world team silver medal in the World Championships at home in Moscow.

External links
 
  (archive)
  (archive)

Russian female foil fencers
Universiade medalists in fencing
Living people
1985 births
Universiade gold medalists for Russia
Universiade silver medalists for Russia
Universiade bronze medalists for Russia
Medalists at the 2007 Summer Universiade
Medalists at the 2011 Summer Universiade
Sportspeople from Kursk Oblast
21st-century Russian women